Hispanirhynchia is a monotypic genus of brachiopods belonging to the family Frieleiidae. The only species is Hispanirhynchia cornea.

References

Rhynchonellida
Brachiopod genera
Monotypic brachiopod genera